Palawaniella is a genus of fungi in the family Parmulariaceae.

Species 

 Palawaniella brosimi
 Palawaniella castanopsidis
 Palawaniella eucleae
 Palawaniella halleriae
 Palawaniella jasmini
 Palawaniella nectandrae
 Palawaniella orbiculata
 Palawaniella xylopiae

References

External links 

 Palawaniella at Index Fungorum

Parmulariaceae